Dick de Man (16 May 1909 – 3 July 1996) was a Dutch swimmer. He competed in the men's 1500 metre freestyle event at the 1928 Summer Olympics.

References

External links
 

1909 births
1996 deaths
Dutch male freestyle swimmers
Olympic swimmers of the Netherlands
Swimmers at the 1928 Summer Olympics
Sportspeople from Utrecht (city)